X Games XVIII (re-titled X Games Los Angeles 2012) was an action sporting event which took place from June 28 – July 1, 2012 in Los Angeles, California. Venues for the event included the Staples Center, Nokia Theater and the streets near L.A. Live. The games featured the sports of Moto X, skateboarding, BMX, and RallyCross. Last year's X Games 17 was the first ever X Games to feature Enduro X, which replaced Super X. In 2013, the Summer X Games will be held in four international cities in Foz do Iguaçu, Brazil (April 18–21, 2013); Barcelona, Spain (May 9–12, 2013); Munich, Germany (June 27–30, 2013); and Los Angeles, California (August 1–4, 2013).

Results

Moto X

* Competition decided by fan text message voting.

Skateboard

BMX

Rally

Medal table

Highlights
 Linkin Park performed on Friday night, June 29, and launched the X Games MUSIC.
 Bob Burnquist won his fourth Big Air gold medal, and his ninth total medals during his participation in all 18 X Games.
 Tanner Foust and Greg Tracy performed a double loop in the Hot Wheels Challenge; the first in X Games history.

References

External links
 XGames.com

X Games in Los Angeles
2012 in American sports
2012 in rallying
2012 in multi-sport events